Dumpton School is an independent day school in Wimborne, Dorset, South West England, for girls and boys aged 2 to 13 years.

History
The school was founded as a boys' preparatory school at Dumpton Park in Kent in 1903 and evacuated to Cranborne Chase in Dorset to avoid bombing raids at the outset of the Second World War, (as were many schools from south-east England).

In 1945, the school moved to Gaunt's House, near Wimborne, and flourished under the Headmastership of Colonel Trevor Card.  Unusually, the dormitories were named in memory of former pupils who had died on active service; (these included Cock, Pollard, Brown, York, Dutton and Fanshawe).   Trevor Card was succeeded by Messrs Carter and Monkhouse as joint heads in 1958 and subsequently by Major General Frank Thompson.

In 1988 the school moved again to its present site at Dean's Grove House nearer to Wimborne.

Notable Old Dumptonians
Sidney Boucher, (1899–1963) Royal Naval officer and first-class cricketer
Toby Buchan, 4th Baron Tweedsmuir
Admiral Jeremy de Halpert
Duncan James (born 1978), pop singer (Blue)
Ore Oduba (born 1986), children's TV presenter (CBBC), 2016 winner of Strictly Come Dancing

References

External links
Dumpton School website
Profile by the Good Schools Guide
ISI Inspection Report, 2013

Wimborne Minster
Preparatory schools in Dorset
Educational institutions established in 1903
1903 establishments in England